Sky du Mont (born Cayetano Neven du Mont; 20 May 1947) is a German-Argentine actor.

Early life 
Sky du Mont's family, who are related to the famous publishers DuMont Schauberg, fled the Nazis in the 1930s to South America. He was born in Argentina as the son of a German and the British Chiquita Neven du Mont (1921–2018). He grew up in England, but came to Germany in 1969, where he studied acting between 1969 and 1972 in Munich.

Career 
In Germany, he is well known for playing suave and urbane, sometimes villainous or shady upper class characters since the 1970s.  He appeared in three of the commercially most successful German film comedies of all time: In Otto – Der Film (1985) as an aristrocratic-looking swindler, as the villain "Santa Maria" in the Western comedy Der Schuh des Manitu (2001) and in Traumschiff Surprise – Periode 1 (2003), where he reprised his role as "Santa Maria" and played a second role as "William der Letzte" (William the Last), an English duke in the Middle Ages.

In international cinema, Sky du Mont portrayed the Hungarian businessman Sandor Szavost in Stanley Kubrick's Eyes Wide Shut (1999) and played one of the Nazi killers in The Boys from Brazil (1978). Other international roles include Count Galeazzo Ciano in the US-miniseries The Winds of War (1983), Claus von Stauffenberg in the sequel War and Remembrance (1989), and a recurring role in the soap opera General Hospital in the 1980s. Du Mont also made an uncredited appearance in Das Boot as the officer aboard the resupply ship Weser to whom the U-96 Second Watch Officer demonstrates Depth-Charging. While he only appears in the background in the theatrical and director's cut, his full appearance is featured in the uncut mini-series.

Du Mont also serves as the German narrator of the children series Thomas & Friends. He is also known for his voiceover work for commercials.

Personal life 
Sky du Mont lives in Hamburg and has been married four times. In 2016, he separated from his wife Mirja Du Mont, who is also the mother of two of his three children, Tara Neven du Mont and Fayn Neven du Mont. His third and oldest son is named Clemens Neven du Mont.

He was a member of the Free Democratic Party and supported them in campaigns, but left them in early 2018.

Selected filmography

Films and Miniseries
 1976: Silence in the Forest
 1978: The Boys From Brazil (credited as "Guy Dumont")
 1979: Avalanche Express
 1979: Goetz von Berlichingen of the Iron Hand 
 1981: Lion of the Desert
 1982: Night Crossing
 1982: Inside the Third Reich (TV miniseries)
 1983: The Winds of War (TV miniseries)
 1983:  (TV film)
 1985: Otto – Der Film
 1986: Love with the Perfect Stranger
 1987: Franza
 1988-1989: War and Remembrance (TV miniseries)
 1992: Judith Krantz's Secrets (TV miniseries)
 1999: Eyes Wide Shut, as Sandor Szavost
 2000: 
 2001: Der Schuh des Manitu
 2004: Traumschiff Surprise – Periode 1
 2011:  (TV film)
 2017: Bullyparade – Der Film

Television Series
 1976: Derrick - Season 3, Episode 2: "Tod des Trompeters"
 1978: Derrick - Season 5, Episode 6: "Klavierkonzert"
 1980: Derrick - Season 7, Episode 6: "Die Entscheidung"
 1982: Derrick - Season 9, Episode 7: "Hausmusik"
 1984: Derrick - Season 11, Episode 4: "Drei atemlose Tage"
 1984: Scarecrow and Mrs. King - Season 2, Episode 2: "The Times They Are a Changin"
 1985: Derrick - Season 12, Episode 1: "Der Mann aus Antibes"
 1986: Derrick - "Der Augenzeuge"
 1988: Derrick - "Die Stimme"
 1988: Derrick - "Die Mordsache Druse"
 1989: General Hospital as Claudio Maldonado
 1992: Derrick - "Mord im Treppenhaus"
 1993: Derrick - "Ein Objekt der Begierde"
 1994: Derrick - "Der Schlüssel"
 1995: Derrick - "Ein Mord und lauter nette Leute"
 1996: Derrick - "Zeuge Karuhn" 
 2005: Arme Millionäre

External links
 
  
 ZBF Agency Munich

References

1947 births
Living people
German male television actors
German male film actors
20th-century German male actors
21st-century German male actors
Argentine male television actors
Argentine male film actors
20th-century Argentine male actors
21st-century Argentine male actors
People from Buenos Aires
Argentine emigrants to Germany
Argentine people of German descent
Argentine people of English descent
German people of English descent
Argentine expatriates in England
German expatriates in England
Citizens of Germany through descent